The County of Ripon is one of the 37 counties of Victoria which are part of the cadastral divisions of Australia, used for land titles. The county includes the plains of the Western District from Ballarat in the east to the Grampians in the west. Larger towns include Beaufort. The county was proclaimed in 1849.

Parishes 
Parishes within the county:
Ararat (part in the County of Borung)
Ascot (part in the County of Talbot)
Baangal  
Ballaarat (parts in the County of Grant, County of Grenville, County of Talbot) 
Ballyrogan  
Beaufort  
Brewster (part in the County of Grenville)
Buangor  
Bunnugal  
Burrah Burrah 
Burrumbeep 
Burrumbeet 
Caramballuc North  
Carngham (part in the County of Grenville)
Chepstowe (part in the County of Grenville)
Colvinsby  
Concongella South (part in the County of Borung)
Dowling Forest (part in the County of Grenville)
Dunneworthy (part in the County of Borung)
Enuc 
Ercildoun (part in the County of Talbot)
Eurambeen 
Gorrinn 
Helendoite  
Kalymna (part in the County of Borung)
Kiora    
Lalkaldarno  
Langi-Gharin  
Langi-kal-kal 
Langi Logan 
Lexington (part in the County of Borung)
Lillirie (part in the County of Grenville)
Livingstone  
Mahkwallok  
Mellier
Merrymbuela (part in the County of Borung)
Minimera 
Moallaack 
Mount Cole (parts in the County of Borung, County of Kara Kara)   
Nanimia 
Nekeeya 
Parrie Yalloak 
Parupa  
Raglan  
Raglan West 
Shirley 
Streatham 
Tara 
 Tatyoon
Trawalla 
Walla Walla 
Watgania 
Watgania West  
Wickliffe North
Wickliffe South 
Willaura 
Wongan 
Woodnaggerak 
Yalla-y-poora 
Yangerahwill

References

Research aids, Victoria 1910
Map of the counties of Follett, Dundas, Ripon, Normanby, Villiers, Hampden, Heytesbury / John Sands

Counties of Victoria (Australia)